Yi Pengfei (born May 1962) is a former Chinese politician who spent his entire career in his home-province Hunan. He was investigated by China's top anti-graft agency in February 2023. Previously he served as vice chairman of the Hunan Provincial Committee of the Chinese People's Political Consultative Conference.

He was a representative of the 19th National Congress of the Chinese Communist Party.

Early life and education
Yi was born in Yiyang, Hunan, in May 1962. After resuming the college entrance examination, in 1979, he was accepted to Hunan College of Finance and Economics (now Hunan University), where he majored in business economy.

Political career
Yi entered politics in 1983, after college. He worked at the Finance and Trade Division of Hunan Provincial Planning Commission (later renamed Hunan Provincial Development Planning Commission) and over a period of 16 years worked his way up to the position of vice director in April 2000. He joined the Chinese Communist Party (CCP) in June 1987.

In June 2008, he was named acting mayor of Huaihua, confirmed in January 2009. He also served as deputy party secretary of the city.

In June 2011, he was assigned to the similar position in Loudi.

In March 2015, he was transferred to Chenzhou and appointed party secretary, the top political position in the city. He also served as chairman of the Chenzhou Municipal People's Congress from January 2017 to April 2021.

He was chosen as vice chairman of the Hunan Provincial Committee of the Chinese People's Political Consultative Conference in January 2018.

Investigation
On 5 February 2022, he was put under investigation for alleged "serious violations of discipline and laws" by the Central Commission for Discipline Inspection (CCDI), the party's internal disciplinary body, and the National Supervisory Commission, the highest anti-corruption agency of China.

References

1962 births
Living people
People from Yiyang
Hunan University alumni
Mayors of Huaihua
Mayors of Loudi
People's Republic of China politicians from Hunan
Chinese Communist Party politicians from Hunan